Jesse Laaksonen (born 1 March 1989) is a Finnish former professional ice hockey forward who last played for Karhu HT II of the 2. Divisioona.

References

Notes 

Living people
Ässät players
1989 births
Finnish ice hockey forwards
People from Nakkila
Sportspeople from Satakunta